Lipinia vassilievi is a species of skink. It is endemic to Vietnam.

References

Lipinia
Reptiles of Vietnam
Endemic fauna of Vietnam
Reptiles described in 2019
Taxa named by Nikolay A. Poyarkov Jr.
Taxa named by Peter Geissler
Taxa named by Vladislav A. Gorin
Taxa named by Evgeniy A. Dunayev
Taxa named by Timo Hartmann
Taxa named by Chatmongkon Suwannapoom